Isla San Diego is a small island in Mexico in the southern Gulf of California.  Administratively it belongs to the municipality of Comondú of the State of Baja California Sur and is very close to the small island called Isla La Habana.

See also

External links 
 Location map of the island

References 

Islands of Baja California Sur
Islands of the Gulf of California
Comondú Municipality
Uninhabited islands of Mexico